The 1430s BC is a decade which lasted from 1439 BC to 1430 BC.

Events and trends
 1437 BC—Legendary King Erichthonius I of Athens dies after a reign of 50 years and is succeeded by his son Pandion I.

References